Craterellus lutescens, formerly sometimes called Cantharellus lutescens or Cantharellus xanthopus or Cantharellus aurora, commonly known as Yellow Foot, is a species of mushroom.   It is closely related to Craterellus tubaeformis. Its hymenium is usually orange or white, whereas the hymenium of C. tubaeformis is grey. C. lutescens is also usually found in wetlands.

Description
The species is more brightly coloured than Craterellus tubaeformis. The cap is lobed irregularly and is brown to bistre. The hymenium and stipe are also more brightly coloured than C. tubaeformis. The hymenium is almost smooth or slightly veined and is pink. The stipe is yellow-orange. The species is edible.

Habitat
The species can commonly be found in large colonies in some coniferous forests, under spruce, mountain fir trees, or pinewoods near the seashore.

Research
An extract of Craterellus lutescens exhibits inhibitory activity on thrombin.

References

External links

 Craterellus aurora MushroomExpert.com

Edible fungi
Cantharellales
Fungi of Europe